Colotis venosa, the no patch tip, is a butterfly in the family Pieridae. It is found in southern Somalia, central and eastern Kenya, north-eastern Tanzania and southern Ethiopia. The habitat consists of very dry savannah.

The larvae feed on Capparis and Cadaba species.

References

Butterflies described in 1885
venosa
Butterflies of Africa
Taxa named by Otto Staudinger